In the Land of Hi-Fi was a Patti Page album issued by Mercury Records on its EmArcy label. Musical accompaniment was by Pete Rugolo and his Orchestra.

The catalog number of the monaural version, first released in 1956, was MG-36074, and of the stereophonic version, released in 1958, it was SR-80000. It was later reissued as Mercury MG-20516 (mono) and SR-60192 (stereo), titled Patti Page With The Pete Rugolo All Stars.

The album was Page's first release on the EmArcy label, generally used by Mercury as a label for jazz albums.

There are time differences between the mono and stereo editions of the album, with several of the tracks edited for space in the stereo version.

Track listing

Releases
 In the Land of Hi Fi, Verve / Emarcy	 1999
 In the Land of Hi Fi, Verve / Emarcy	 1999
 In the Land of Hi Fi, Universal Distribution	 2007
 In the Land of Hi Fi, Universal Distribution	 2007
 Patti Page with Pete Rugolo and His Orchestra, Fresh Sound Records  2009

References

External links
 In the Land of Hi Fi

Mercury Records albums
Patti Page albums
1956 albums
EmArcy Records albums
Albums produced by Bob Shad